is a Japanese footballer who plays as a forward for JFL club FC Tiamo Hirakata.

Playing career
Ogaki was born in Osaka Prefecture on February 28, 2000. After graduating from high school, he joined J1 League club Nagoya Grampus in 2018.

Career statistics

Last update: 30 August 2021

References

External links

Profile at FC Tiamo Hirakata

2000 births
Living people
Association football people from Osaka Prefecture
Japanese footballers
J3 League players
Nagoya Grampus players
Iwate Grulla Morioka players
Japanese expatriate footballers
Japanese expatriate sportspeople in Latvia
FK RFS players
BFC Daugavpils players
Expatriate footballers in Latvia
Association football forwards